Triglav Kranj may refer to:

 NK Triglav Kranj, Slovenian association football club
 HK Triglav Kranj, Slovenian ice hockey club